On 15 January 2023, a bomb exploded during a Sunday service in a Pentecostal church in the Democratic Republic of the Congo. It happened in Kasindi, which is in North Kivu and is close to the Ugandan border. At least 17 people were killed and 39 more were injured by the attack, which was claimed by the Islamic State. Authorities blamed the Allied Democratic Forces (ADF), a Ugandan Islamist group whose insurgency began in 1996 and spread to the DRC; the group pledged allegiance to the Islamic State. A Kenyan was arrested at the scene.

References

2023 murders in the Democratic Republic of the Congo
Attacks on buildings and structures in 2023
Attacks on churches in Africa
Church bombings by Islamists
Improvised explosive device bombings in 2023
Islamic terrorist incidents in 2023
January 2023 crimes in Africa
January 2023 events in the Democratic Republic of the Congo
North Kivu